David Cunningham (born 28 January 1962 in Melbourne) is an Australian sport shooter. He competed at the 1996 and 2000 Summer Olympics; in 1996, he tied for 20th place in the men's skeet event, while in 2000, he tied for 39th place in the men's skeet event.

References

1962 births
Living people
Skeet shooters
Australian male sport shooters
Shooters at the 1996 Summer Olympics
Shooters at the 2000 Summer Olympics
Olympic shooters of Australia
Commonwealth Games medallists in shooting
Commonwealth Games silver medallists for Australia
Commonwealth Games bronze medallists for Australia
Shooters at the 1998 Commonwealth Games
Shooters at the 2002 Commonwealth Games
20th-century Australian people
21st-century Australian people
Sportspeople from Melbourne
Sportsmen from Victoria (Australia)
Medallists at the 1998 Commonwealth Games
Medallists at the 2002 Commonwealth Games